Muar Bypass, or Federal Route 224, is a major highway bypass and the first highway built in Bandar Maharani Muar, a royal town in Johor, Malaysia. The  highway bypass linking Parit Bunga in the northwest to Parit Sakai in the southeast. The Kilometre Zero of the Federal Route 224 starts at Parit Sakai junctions.

History
Between the 1990s and the 2000s, traffic congestion was prevalent at the Sultan Ismail Bridge and Muar town centre since the official opening of the North–South Expressway Southern Route between Ayer Keroh and Pagoh and the opening of the Tangkak and Pagoh Interchange on 1 April 1989. To this end, in 1998, the federal government announced that the new second bridge would be built at Parit Bunga to ease congestion on the existing bridge. In addition, a new bypass linking Parit Bunga to Parit Sakai would be built.

The Public Works Department of Malaysia (JKR) and the main contractor Ranhill Bersekutu Sdn Bhd Co began construction of the bypass in 2002. The second bridge and the bypass were opened to traffic in 2004, while the rest of the project was completed in 2005.

In 2008, the highway was gazetted as the federal roads by JKR as Federal Route 224.

Project highlights
Construction of a 632-metre landmark single-plane semi harp cable-stayed bridge with a 132-metre mid-span across Muar River and a 13-kilometre road bypassing the town of Muar inclusive of one Parit Bunga Interchange.

This project had two key briefs:-
to alleviate traffic congestion in the Muar area by constructing a major bypass road with an elevated interchange over the existing junction.
to design and build a landmark bridge across Muar River.

The project involved Ranhill Bersekutu Sdn Bhd Co undertaking the engineering, design, construction, engineering, and environmental impact assessments and controls. Creativity was the key to the bridge design, with a need for aesthetic as well as functional considerations. With the rapid growth in the region, the bridge is set to become a defining feature of the local landscape, and had to be designed with this level of impact in mind. The result is a spectacular structure that is sympathetic to its surroundings, taking into account various environmental aspects. Use of new technology, combined with the unique method of construction - a cast-in-situ bridge deck segmental box girder – using the traveler formworks has increased ease of construction, minimised use of materials and proved to be cost-effective.

At the same time, the construction of the 13 kilometre bypass road also includes seven grade signalised intersections and five grade unsignalised junctions, cross culverts and drainage, as well as an elevated interchange over the existing junction. Ranhill also conducted a separate traffic study to ensure that the needs of the local community were being fully met.

With construction taking place within a mangrove area, the bridge and the earthworks for the road construction is carefully monitored through a specific government-approved environmental management plan, with the objective of retaining as much of the natural surroundings as possible.

Features
The main feature of the bypass is the Muar Second Bridge. Other features include a pedestrian bridge and the Parit Bunga complex interchange, which is the first of its kind in Muar. The bypass is a 4-lane carriageway with reserves land for future widening and construction of new interchanges.

At most sections, the Federal Route 224 was built under the JKR R5 road standard, allowing maximum speed limit of up to 90 km/h.

List of junctions and interchanges

See also
 Malaysian Federal Roads system
 Muar

References

 Muar Bypass on Ranhill Berhad

Malaysian Federal Roads
Highways in Malaysia
Ring roads in Malaysia
Muar District